Christina Rindom (born 10 April 1973) is a Danish rower. She competed in the women's quadruple sculls event at the 2004 Summer Olympics.

References

1973 births
Living people
Danish female rowers
Olympic rowers of Denmark
Rowers at the 2004 Summer Olympics
Rowers from Copenhagen